Igor Newerly or Igor Abramow-Newerly (24 March 1903, Białowieża – 19 October 1987, Warsaw, Polish People's Republic) was a Polish novelist and educator.  He was born into a Czech-Russian family. His son is Polish novelist Jarosław Abramow-Newerly. His grandfather Józef Newerly, was a Czech national, who held a title of Lovtchiy (: "Master of the Hunt") to the court of Tsar Nicholas II of Russia.

Igor Newerly lost one leg as a child. He studied law at Kiev University but he was relegated for political reasons, arrested and sent to Odessa. In 1924 he emigrated illegally to the newly independent Poland and was active in the field of pedagogy in Warsaw.  He worked together with the renowned educator Janusz Korczak, and in 1926 became his secretary. From 1932 to 1939 Newerly worked for Mały Przegląd (Little Review). He married Barbara Jarecka.

Under the Nazi German occupation of Poland Newerly was a member of the Polish resistance. He helped Janusz Korczak at his Orphanage and saved his diary of martyrdom. He also hid from Nazi persecution several of his Jewish colleagues from Nasz Przegląd daily – among them Kuba Hersztein – and transported Lejzor Czarnobroda to Warsaw after he escaped from the train to Treblinka and broke his leg. Newerly was arrested at the beginning of 1943 by the German Gestapo and imprisoned at Pawiak in Warsaw. Until the end of the war he was an inmate of Nazi concentration camps: Majdanek, Auschwitz, Oranienburg and Bergen Belsen where he was liberated.

After the war in 1945, he resumed a pedagogical career.  Based on Newerly's novel Pamiątka z Celulozy (A Souvenir from the Cellulose Mill), the Polish director Jerzy Kawalerowicz made two films: Celuloza (Cellulose Mill) and Pod gwiazdą frygijską (Under the Phrygian Star).

His son is Jarosław Abramow-Newerly, a writer.

Works 
Chłopiec z Salskich Stepów 1948
Archipelag ludzi odzyskanych 1950
Pamiątka z Celulozy 1952
Leśne morze 1960
Żywe wiązanie 1966
Rozmowa w sadzie piątego sierpnia, Warszawa, Czytelnik 1978
Za Opiwardą, za siódmą rzeką..., Warszawa, Czytelnik, 1985
Wzgórze błękitnego snu, Warszawa, Czytelnik, 1986
Zostało z uczty bogów, Paryż, Instytut Literacki, 1986

Film screen-plays
Król Maciuś I, 1957
Pod gwiazdą frygijską
Celuloza, 1953

Notes

Bibliography 
 Igor Newerly, Zostało z uczty bogów
 Michał Grynberg, Księga Sprawiedliwych (Book of the Righteous), Warsaw, PWN, 1993. (ill., ports., 766 pp.)

1903 births
1987 deaths
Polish schoolteachers
20th-century Polish novelists
Polish male novelists
Polish resistance members of World War II
Polish Righteous Among the Nations
Auschwitz concentration camp survivors
Majdanek concentration camp survivors
Sachsenhausen concentration camp survivors
Bergen-Belsen concentration camp survivors
Recipients of the Order of the Banner of Work
People from the Russian Empire of Czech descent
Soviet people of Czech descent
Polish people of Czech descent
Polish people of Russian descent
People from Hajnówka County
20th-century Polish male writers
Soviet emigrants to Poland
Recipients of the State Award Badge (Poland)